Battle of Rügen was a major naval battle fought on August 8, 1715 off Jasmund on the Swedish island of Rügen (present-day Germany) during the Great Northern War.

In the Swedish navy 20 ships of the line and two frigates participated, in the Danish 21 ships of the line and four frigates. The battle ended with a Danish strategic victory but was tactically inconclusive. No ships were lost on either side but many soldiers were either dead or wounded – Sweden: 478, Denmark: 612.

Timing of events
Vice admiral Christen Thomesen Sehested flew his flag from HDMS Justitia as commander of the vanguard of Raben's fleet which was sent on 9 July 1715 to Pomerania to ensure passage of troop transports of 6000 men to the land forces on Rügen besieging Stralsund. (Admiral Knud Reedtz had been assembling these troop transports in Grønsund between the Danish islands of Falster and Møn from midsummer 1714.)
On 20 July Admiral Raben, in command of the main Danish fleet, retreated to Øresund (off Copenhagen) when faced with an overwhelming Swedish force until he could be reinforced - leaving Sehested's squadron to occupy the Swedish fleet without engaging them. 
Before the battle, Sehested had been replaced by vice admiral Just Juel and his flagship, Justitia, was now commanding the rear guard of the Danish fleet. In the battle of 8 August vice admiral Juel was killed.
The battle, although inconclusive in naval terms, forced the Swedish fleet to withdraw and allowed the troop transports to proceed. Nydyb was taken on 25 -26 September, the island of Rügen 
surrendered after the Battle of Stresow on 15 November  and Stralsund itself  two days before Christmas 1715.

Notes

References

Citation
T. A. Topsøe-Jensen og Emil Marquard (1935) “Officerer i den dansk-norske Søetat 1660-1814 og den danske Søetat 1814-1932“. Two volumes. Volume 1 and Volume 2 are downloadable. Hard copies are listed in libraries Stockholm, Odense, Ballerup and Copenhagen

Rügen
Rügen
Rügen
1715 in Denmark
Rügen